WLM or wlm may refer to or stand for:

Computing
 Windows Live Mail, a former e-mail and newsgroup client included in Microsoft's Windows Live group of services
 Windows Live Messenger, a former free instant message program by Microsoft
 Workload Manager, a resource distributor in IBMs mainframe z/OS operating system

Organizations and movements
 West London Methodist Mission, a British Methodist mission, also known as West London Mission
 White Lives Matter, an international activist group created in response to Black Lives Matter
 Women's Liberation Movement, a former political alignment of women and feminist intellectualism

Other uses
 Middle Welsh, based on its iso language code wlm.
 Wiki Loves Monuments, an annual international photographic competition
 Wolf-Lundmark-Melotte, a barred irregular galaxy
 (WLM), the United States Navy and United States Coast Guard hull classification symbol for Coast Guard coastal buoy tenders